The Marketts were an American instrumental pop group, formed in January 1961 in Hollywood, California, by Michael Z. Gordon. They are best known for their 1964 million-seller, "Out of Limits".

Biography
The Marketts' line-up featured Michael Z. Gordon and various session musicians from the Los Angeles area, including drummer Hal Blaine. The group name was originally spelled "Mar-Kets". The group's direction was spearheaded by producer Joe Saraceno and Michael Z. Gordon, although Saraceno could not arrange or play on any of the group's material. Gordon's songs which were composed for the Marketts are best remembered for their surf rock sound, though not all of their material has this sound; Gordon took the group's style in whatever direction he thought would catch the record-buying public's ear.  In the U.S., the group had three Top 40 hits and had two popular albums, many of the songs composed by Gordon.

The Marketts' surfer sound started with "Surfer's Stomp", which was by written by and produced by Gordon and Saraceno. Gordon also wrote their biggest hit, "Out of Limits", which was originally entitled "Outer Limits", named after the 1963 TV series The Outer Limits. Rod Serling sued the Marketts for quoting the four-note motif from his television show, The Twilight Zone, without his approval, which resulted in the change of the title to "Out of Limits".  It reached No. 3 on the Billboard Hot 100 chart in 1964. It sold over one million copies, and was awarded a gold disc. The band name was used as late as 1977 for further releases, though their last hit came in 1966.

Members
 Hal Blaine
 George Dee
 Michael Z. Gordon
 Danny Hamilton
 Judd Hamilton
 Gene Pello
 Ray Pohlman
 Richard Torres

Discography

Albums
Surfer's Stomp (Liberty, 1962)
The Marketts Take To Wheels (Warner Bros., 1963)
Out of Limits! (Warner Bros., 1963) U.S. No. 37
The Surfing Scene (Liberty, 1963) (reissue of Surfer's Stomp)
The Batman Theme (Warner Bros., 1966) U.S. No. 82 (Tracks: 1. "Batman Theme" 2. "Bat Cave" 3. "Robin the Boy Wonder" 4. "Bat Signal" 5. "Batmobile" 6. "The Joker" 7. "The Penguin" 8. "The Bat" 9. "Dr. Death" 10. "The Riddler" 11. "Bat Cape" 12. "The Cat Woman")
Sun Power (World Pacific, 1967)
AM-FM, Etc. (Mercury, 1973) (featured new versions of "Balboa Blue" and "Surfer's Stomp" and a cover of the Mystery Movie theme)
Tryin' To Get That Feeling (Arista, 1975)
Summer Means Love (Dore, 1982)

Singles

See also
 We'll Sing in the Sunshine

References

Musical groups from Los Angeles
Surf music groups